The Arizona Student Hunger Strike is an ongoing youth activist demonstration caused by the failure of the U.S. Congress to pass the For the People Act and John Lewis Voting Rights Act into law. The strikes originally began on December 6, 2021, after Senator Kyrsten Sinema (D-AZ) showed reservations about abolishing the filibuster to allow the bill to pass the senate with the 50 seat majority held by the Democrats, rather than the 60 vote supermajority needed for all other legislation. 25 students participated in the strike, mostly from the University of Arizona, or Arizona State University. The first strike ended after 15 days after Senate Majority Leader Chuck Schumer (D-NY) stated that the Senate would begin talks on the bills after it reconvened in January 2022. However he bill's passage has become all but certain to fail after Sinema stated in a speech to the Senate on January 13 that while she is in favor of the bill, she cannot vote to abolish the filibuster. The students who participated in the first strike vowed to resume their strike, taking to TikTok and other social media websites to gather support for their mission. The second strike began on January 14, 2022, with about 40 participants who vow to continue the strike indefinitely until the legislation is passed into law.

First strike
On Monday December 6, 2021, a group of 20 Arizona youth started an indefinite hunger strike for democracy in front of the Arizona State Capitol in Phoenix. Most of them were students from the Arizona State University or the University of Arizona. They were asking the White House and the United States Congress to pass the Freedom to Vote Act by the end of the year.

On Thursday December 9, the group virtually met with Senator Kyrsten Sinema. Senator Sinema expressed her gratitude to the students for their activism and reaffirmed her support for the Freedom to Vote Act and the John Lewis Voting Rights Advancement Act. Both bills had passed the United States House and were blocked by a Republican filibuster in the United States Senate.

On Friday, the group flew to Washington DC. On Saturday, they resumed their hunger strike in front of the White House in the Lafayette Square. By that time, the hunger strikers hadn't eaten for 6 days. 

On Monday, young people from Texas, Florida, Utah and Virginia also joined the hunger strike. Harvard Law School Professor and nationally renown author, Lawrence Lessig, joined the students in the hunger strike as well. Radio host, Joe Madison, who had been on hunger strike for democracy for 35 days, also joined them. Activists from Black Voters Matter and New York Fair Elections Coalition and veterans from Common Defense spoke in the 11 am rally. 

The hunger strikers said they would host rallies every day at 11 am and wouldn't leave the Lafayette Square, where the hunger strike is, until the Freedom to Vote Act is passed.

The hunger strike was organized by UnPAC, a political organization of nonpartisan youth working to fix democracy. The group had organized door-to-door canvassing and other activities in West Virginia and Arizona to educate people about and rally support for the Freedom to Vote Act. They said the strike was a "last-ditch effort" to help pass the legislation before the end of the year. A few strikers had since dropped out on advice of doctors. 

On December 14 (Day 9), three Texas House Representatives flew in to support them: Trey Martinez Fischer (D-San Antonio), Gina Hinojosa (D-Austin) and Jasmine Crockett (D-Dallas).

On December 16 (Day 11), the hunger strikers had an in-person meeting with Senator Mark Kelly (D-Arizona). 

The hunger strikers were interviewed multiple times by MSNBC.

In the early morning of Saturday December 18, Senate adjourned for the rest of the year without passing the Freedom to Vote Act. 

On December 20 (Day 15), Senate Majority Leader Chuck Schumer (D-NY) announced in a Dear Colleague letter that the Senate will take up the voting bills in the week of January 3, when the Senate resumes. The organizers decided that they had achieved as much as they could and called off the hunger strike. They vowed to escalate again if the Freedom to Vote Act isn't passed by the Martin Luther King Jr Day (January 17).

References

Hunger strikes
Democracy
Democracy activists